Eastington may refer to the following places in England:

Eastington, Devon
Eastington, Cotswold, Gloucestershire, near Northleach
Eastington, Stroud, Gloucestershire, near Stonehouse